Easy Living is a 1949 American drama film directed by Jacques Tourneur, starring Victor Mature, Lucille Ball and Lizabeth Scott. The film features the real-life Los Angeles Rams football team.

Plot
Star professional quarterback Pete Wilson thinks nothing of his future after football, not even after longtime teammate Bill "Holly" Holloran is released by the team. Pete gets advance after advance on his salary from Anne, the secretary of team owner and coach Lenahan.

One day, however, he goes secretly to see a doctor about various symptoms he has been experiencing and learns that he has a heart condition due to a childhood bout of rheumatic fever, one that could kill him if he continues playing football. He starts to tell his wife Liza, but changes his mind when she is cool to Holly, whom she refers to as a has-been after he is gone.

Liza is struggling to make her own interior design business a success, and drags Pete to a fancy party to try to land Gilbert Vollmer as a client. Gilbert knows she has no talent, but is interested in her for other reasons. So is his father, Howard. The older man is looking to replace his young girlfriend, Billy Duane, and dangles before Liza the prospect of redecorating his apartment. Knowing what he is after, Liza is willing to do whatever it takes to further her ambitions.

Meanwhile, Pete is bitterly disappointed when his friend, retiring college head coach Virgil Ryan, informs him that he cannot recommend him as his replacement because Liza is unsuitable for the duties of a coach's wife. Instead, the job is given to Pete's teammate and friend, Tim "Pappy" McCarr. Tim offers Pete the position of his assistant, but Pete turns it down.

Afraid of physical contact, Pete turns in a very poor performance and loses the next game. Lenahan cannot afford another loss if he wants to make the playoffs (and earn $100,000), so he benches Pete in favor of Tim. Tim plays well, and they win their next game.

When Pete proposes taking the assistant coaching position, Liza breaks up with him. However, when she gets dumped by Howard, she tries unsuccessfully to get Pete back. Pete is given another chance at glory when Tim is injured, but ultimately tells his teammates about his condition and walks away from the game. Though Anne has made it clear that she loves him, Pete decides to take Liza back, making it clear, however, that it will be on his terms.

Cast

 Victor Mature as Pete Wilson
 Lucille Ball as Anne, Lenahan's secretary
 Lizabeth Scott as Liza Wilson
 Sonny Tufts as Tim "Pappy" McCarr
 Lloyd Nolan as Lenahan
 Paul Stewart as Dave Argus, a reporter
 Jack Paar as Scoop Spooner
 Jeff Donnell as Penny McCarr
 Art Baker as Howard Vollmer
 Gordon Jones as Bill "Holly" Holloran
 Don Beddoe as Jaeger
 Richard Erdman as Buddy Morgan (as Dick Erdman)
 William "Bill" Phillips as Ozzie, the trainer
 Charles Lang as Whitey
 Kenny Washington as Benny
 Julia Dean as Mrs. Belle Ryan, Virgil's wife
 Everett Glass as Virgil Ryan
 Jim Backus as Dr. Franklin (as James Backus)
 Robert Ellis as Urchin
 Michael St. Angel as Gilbert Vollmer (as Steven Flagg)
 Alex Sharp as Don
 Russell Thorson as Hunk "Eddie" Edwards (as Russ Thorson)
 June Bright as Billy Duane, who commits suicide when Howard Vollmer discards her
 Edward Kotal as Curly
 Audrey Young as Singer

Production

Development
The film was based on a screen story by Irwin Shaw, Education of the Heart. RKO purchased it in April 1946. In June Robert Sparks was assigned the job of producing and Charles Schnee the job of writing the screenplay.

In May 1948 the title was changed to Interference.

Cast
In May 1948 RKO announced Jane Greer and Robert Mitchum would play the leads. Neither ended up in the final film.

Victor Mature was under contract to 20th Century Fox but had an obligation to make a movie at RKO which dated from before the war. He was announced for Battleground and Mr Whiskers before eventually being cast in Interference in June 1948. On the same day this was confirmed he was also announced for the lead in Samson and Delilah, which would be filmed after Interference. (He would end up playing Mr Whiskas which became Gambling House.)

In June Jacques Tourneur was assigned to direct. Other key roles went to Sonny Tufts, Lucille Ball and Lizabeth Scott.

Shooting
There was a great deal of turbulence at RKO at the time due to the fact that Howard Hughes had bought the studio and head of production Dore Schary had resigned. Films such as Battleground, Bed of Roses and Setup were cancelled. However Interference went ahead started July 12, 1948.

Tourneur called the film "a hard one" for him because he had no interest in football. He later said it was "a very bad film."

The film was originally meant to end with Mature's character leaving his wife for Ball. However it was rewritten during filming so Mature stayed with his wife.

Release
The film was not released until October 1949, by which time its title had been changed to Easy Living. The delayed release meant it could cash in on the publicity for Samson and Delilah, which came out in December.

Reception
The New York Times critic gave the film a favorable review, writing that while it "doesn't have the searing candor and impact of some of its predecessors, neither is it a conventional rah-rah cream puff. For Charles Schnee has written a bright, well-knit adaptation of an Irwin Shaw short story, a capable cast has given it the works and the off-screen coaching of the director, Jacques Tourneur, is as crisp and telling as the late Knute Rockne's."

The Los Angeles called it "moody cinema". The film recorded a financial loss of $625,000.

Lawsuit
In November 1949 screenwriters John Stone and Frederick Bond claimed Easy Living was based on their story Never Say Die which they submitted to RKO in 1947. They sued RKO, RKO's story editor and Shaw for $150,000 in damages.

References

Notes

External links
 
 
 
 

1949 films
American sports drama films
1949 romantic drama films
1940s sports drama films
American football films
American romantic drama films
American black-and-white films
1940s English-language films
Films scored by Roy Webb
Films directed by Jacques Tourneur
Films with screenplays by Irwin Shaw
RKO Pictures films
1940s American films